Domination is a role-playing game published by StarChilde Publications in 1989.

Description
Domination is a science fiction system set in a near-future in which the Earth has been conquered by the alien Kalotions. The player characters are members of the human resistance. Players select character classes (commando, intelligence agent, pilot, etc.) that determine which skills the character has. The game briefly describes the Kalotions, their technology, and the alien subject races they employ in oppressing the Earthlings. It also covers the major resistance groups, their key leaders, and common modern weapons.

Publication history
Domination was designed by Blaine Pardoe, and published by StarChilde Publications in 1989 as a digest-sized 100-page book.

Reception
Lawrence Schick notes that the "combat rules are simple", and comments that this game is "A brief set of rules by current standards, with the mere outline of a campaign setting."

References

Role-playing games introduced in 1989
Science fiction role-playing games